İsnov is a village and municipality in the Quba Rayon of Azerbaijan. It has a population of 1,014.  The municipality consists of the villages of İsnov, Qasımqışlaq, Mahmudqışlaq, Kələnov, and Çayqışlaq.

References

Populated places in Quba District (Azerbaijan)